Hungary–Israel relations are the foreign relations between Hungary and Israel. Hungary has an embassy in Tel Aviv and 4 honorary consulates (in Eilat, Haifa, Jerusalem and Tel Aviv). Israel has an embassy in Budapest and an honorary consulate in Szeged.

According to the Israeli Central Bureau for Statistics, There were 47,500 Jews living in Hungary in 2018. Both countries are full members of the Union for the Mediterranean.

Both countries have stressed the increasing trade and tourism between one another and an estimated 30,000 Hungarian Jews emigrated to Israel in 1948.

History

20th century
During the first half of the 20th century, many Hungarian Jews had been suffering from antisemitism. The Nazis killed 564,000 Hungarian Jews in 1944 – during the Holocaust.

The diplomatic relations between Hungary and the State of Israel were officially established in 1949. Hungary opened a legation in Israel, along with other countries from the Eastern Bloc in 1952. Hungary severed its relations with Israel after the Six-day war, like many other countries from Eastern Europe, as a result of that, the Hungarian legation in Israel closed.

In the late-1980s Mikhail Gorbachev started reforms of democratization in the USSR. The Hungarian leader János Kádár agreed with Gorbachev's reforms, and its country became closer to the western countries. the first unofficial ties between the countries started in September 1987, when Hungary and Israel opened non-resident interest offices for each other. The official diplomatic relations have fully restored in 1989.

21st century
In the 21st century, Hungary is known as one of the closest allies of Israel in Europe, breaking the European consensus many times and standing on Israel's side. The Hungarian and Israeli leaders have both made official visits many times.

In 2019, Hungary opened a trade office in Jerusalem, recognizing it as an integral part of Israel de facto.

On 21 May 2020, the Hungarian Minister of Foreign Affairs has spoken to his Israeli colleague and told him that "Hungary will always stand beside Israel". He also criticized Europe for its "politic hypocrisy". Later that year, the two countries have decided to co-operate in the field of Space-research.

On 18 May 2021, Hungary blocked the EU from taking a formal position on 2021 Israel–Palestine crisis. Hungary's Foreign Minister Péter Szijjártó accused the EU of opposing Israel. "I have a general problem with these European statements on Israel..., These are usually very much one-sided, and these statements do not help, especially not under current circumstances, when the tension is so high." - he told.

In January 2022, Israeli Prime Minister Naftali Bennett thanked his Hungarian counterpart, Prime Minister Viktor Orbán, for the Hungarian government’s consistent support of Israel at international forums.

See also
 Foreign relations of Hungary
 Foreign relations of Israel
 History of the Jews in Hungary

References

Further reading
 Yosef Govrin, יחסי ישראל עם מדינות מזרח אירופה, Magnes, 2009.

External links

 

 
Israel
Bilateral relations of Israel